George Washington Witherspoon (December 15, 1845 - January 2, 1892) was a shoemaker, A.M.E. minister, and state legislator in Florida.

Witherspoon was born in the South Carolina's Sumter District. He represented Jefferson County in the Florida House of Representatives in 1875, 1877, 1879, and 1883. He was a Republican Party candidate for a seat in the U.S. congress in 1880. He won the Republican Party nomination over Malachi Martin but lost the general election to a Democrat whose majority was attributed to fraud. He served as a councilman in Pensacola, Florida from 1885 to 1889.

See also
African-American officeholders during and following the Reconstruction era

Further reading
Florida's Second Generation of Black Leadership by Canter Brown Jr. ACR January - March 2003

References

People from Sumter County, South Carolina
1845 births
1892 deaths
Florida city council members
Republican Party members of the Florida House of Representatives
People from Pensacola, Florida
19th-century American politicians
People from Jefferson County, Florida
African Methodist Episcopal Church clergy
African-American politicians during the Reconstruction Era
Shoemakers
African-American state legislators in Florida